Metsamor site is the remains of an old fortress located to the southwest of the Armenian village of Taronik, in the Armavir Province.

While it used to be believed the city of Metsamor was destroyed by the Urartians during the Iron Age researchers now believe it was destroyed by Scythian or Cimmerian nomads.

Archaeological research 
Research in Metsamor has been conducted since 1965. Until the 1990s, work was carried out by Armenian teams directed by Emma Khanzadyan and Koryun Mkrtchyan; in the years 2011–2013, Ashot Piliposyan headed the excavations. All the finds are displayed in the museum located at the site. In 2013, an Armenian-Polish archaeological expedition started work in Metsamor as a result of the cooperation between the Institute of Archaeology and the Polish Centre of Mediterranean Archaeology (both University of Warsaw) and the Service for the Protection of Historical and Cultural Environment and Museum Reservation, Ministry of Culture of the Republic of Armenia. Krzysztof Jakubiak (IA UW) and Ashot Piliposyan are co-directors of the mission. Jakubiak says that Metsamor "has an important role among the settlements of the Ararat Valley."

The central part of the site lies on a hill overlooking the Ararat Valley. The research is conducted in the fortified citadel and the so-called lower town lying below it, as well as in the cemetery located about 500 m to the east. Already in the first seasons, an undisturbed stratigraphic sequence from the Bronze Age (the Kura-Arax period) to the medieval times was documented. The oldest traces of settlement date to the turn of the 4th millennium BC (Chalcolithic), the youngest, to the 17th century. In the Late Bronze and Early Iron Ages (15th–8th century BC), the settlement became an important religious and economic center with a developed metallurgical production. On the southern slope of the hill, a large religious complex was discovered, consisting of five small temples with clay “cascading” altars. The most famous finds include ornaments, e.g., gold necklaces and gilded belt fittings with depictions of hunting lionesses.

Metsamor Museum 
The Museum of History and Archeology at Metsamor Site was opened in 1968. It is the repository of more than 22,000 items, almost all discovered at the site.

References 

 Jakubiak K., Iskra M., Piliposyan A., and Zaqyan A. (2017). Preliminary report on the 2016 season in Metsamor (Armenia). Polish Archaeology in the Mediterranean, 26/1 (2017)
 TruszkowResearch in Metsamor has been conducted since 1965.[2] Until the 1990s, work was carried out by Armenian teams directed by Emma Khanzadyan and Koryun Mkrtchyan; in the years 2011–2013, Ashot Piliposyan headed the excavations. [3] All the finds are displayed in the museum located at the site. In 2013, an Armenian-Polish archaeological expedition started work in Metsamor as a result of the cooperation between the Institute of Archaeology and the Polish Centre of Mediterranean Archaeology (both University of Warsaw) and the Service for the Protection of Historical and Cultural Environment and Museum Reservation, Ministry of Culture of the Republic of Armenia. Krzysztof Jakubiak (IA UW) and Ashot Piliposyan are co-directors of the mission.[1] ski, M., Bagi, O. Aerial survey of the necropolis and the surrounding fields at Metsamor. Polish Archaeology in the Mediterranean, 26/1 (2017)
 Jakubiak K., Piliposyan A., Iskra M. and Zaqyan A. Metsamor, First preliminary report of seasons 2013, 2014, 2015. Polish Archaeology in the Mediterranean, 25 (2016)
 Khanzadyan E., MResearch in Metsamor has been conducted since 1965.[2] Until the 1990s, work was carried out by Armenian teams directed by Emma Khanzadyan and Koryun Mkrtchyan; in the years 2011–2013, Ashot Piliposyan headed the excavations. [3] All the finds are displayed in the museum located at the site. In 2013, an Armenian-Polish archaeological expedition started work in Metsamor as a result of the cooperation between the Institute of Archaeology and the Polish Centre of Mediterranean Archaeology (both University of Warsaw) and the Service for the Protection of Historical and Cultural Environment and Museum Reservation, Ministry of Culture of the Republic of Armenia. Krzysztof Jakubiak (IA UW) and Ashot Piliposyan are co-directors of the mission.[1] krtchyan K. and Parsamyan E. Metsamor: Usumnasirut’yun 1965–1966t’t’. peghumneri tvyalnerov, Yerevan: Akademiya Nauk Armianskoe S.S.R. (1973)

Footnotes 

 
The Armenian History", by Armenia's National Academy of Sciences (1971)
"From the History of Ancient Armenia", by Dr.Suren Aivazyan
"Evolution of the World Alphabets", by Dr.Armen Melkonyan

Archaeological sites in Armenia
Megalithic monuments in Europe
Former populated places in the Caucasus
Buildings and structures in Armavir Province